The Medina Railroad Museum is a railroad museum located at 530 West Avenue in Medina, New York, which is northeast of Buffalo and northwest of Rochester.

The museum is housed in one of the largest standing wooden freight depots, built in 1905.   The Museum is TEMPORARILY closed for the winter will reopen in the spring.

Its exhibits feature interactive displays, 6000 artifacts, memorabilia, photos, toys and a model railroad, all relating to the railroads of western New York.  It also includes a collection of historic fire fighting equipment.

The museum sponsors passenger excursion train trips on a seasonal schedule between Medina and Lockport - as well as hosting an annual (June) Thomas the Tank Engine, Day Out with Thomas events.

In 1997 the boundaries of the village's Main Street Historic District were redrawn to include the building as a contributing property after research established that it was related to other buildings in that district.

References

External links
 Medina Railroad Museum
 Medina Railroad Museum on RocWiki.org
 Photos of RR Museum on Flickr.com

Railroad museums in New York (state)
Heritage railroads in New York (state)
Former New York Central Railroad stations
Transport infrastructure completed in 1905
Museums in Orleans County, New York
Historic district contributing properties in New York (state)
National Register of Historic Places in Orleans County, New York
Railway stations on the National Register of Historic Places in New York (state)
Railway stations in the United States  opened in 1905
Repurposed railway stations in the United States
Former railway stations in New York (state)